Sofian El Moudane (born 16 March 1994) is a Franco-Moroccan professional footballer who currently plays for Botola club RS Berkane as a midfielder.

Club career

FK Senica
El Moudane made his professional Fortuna Liga debut for Senica against AS Trenčín on 16 February 2019.

References

External links
 FK Senica official club profile 
 
 Futbalnet profile 
 

1994 births
Living people
Footballers from Saint-Étienne
French sportspeople of Moroccan descent
French footballers
French expatriate footballers
Association football midfielders
Athlético Marseille players
FK Senica players
Slovak Super Liga players
Ittihad Tanger players
Botola players
Expatriate footballers in Slovakia
French expatriate sportspeople in Slovakia
Expatriate footballers in Morocco
French expatriate sportspeople in Morocco
Moroccan footballers